Yes I Do is a studio album by Anne Murray issued in 1991. The single "Everyday" from the album peaked at number 56 on the Billboard Hot Country Singles & Tracks chart.

Track listing
"Overboard" (T. Graham Brown, Wayland Holyfield, Verlon Thompson) - 3:55
"I Can See Arkansas" (James Nihan, Wood Newton) - 4:10
"Even the Nights Are Better" (Originally by Air Supply) (Ken Bell, J. L. Wallace, Terry Skinner) - 3:44
"You Sure Know How to Make a Memory" (Naomi Martin, Mike Reid) - 3:10
"Oh, Yes I Do" (Beth Nielsen Chapman, Kent Robbins) - 3:00
"Some Days It Rains All Night Long" (Ed Penney) - 2:56
"Roots and Wings" (Susan Longacre, Randy Sharp) - 3:40
"If I Ever See You Again" (Bill Rice, Sharon Rice) - 3:46
"Wrong End of the Rainbow" (Milton Blackford, Richard Leigh) - 3:14
"Everyday" (Spady Brannon, David Malloy) - 3:20
"Si Jamais Je Te Revois (If I Ever See You Again)" (Bill Rice, Sharon Rice, Gilles Goddard) - 3:47

Personnel 
 Anne Murray – vocals 
 Phil Naish – keyboards 
 Doug Riley – acoustic piano 
 Mike Lawler – synthesizers 
 Steve Gibson – guitars 
 Billy Joe Walker Jr. – acoustic guitars 
 Chris Leuzinger – dobro
 Paul Franklin – steel guitar
 Bob Wray – bass guitar 
 Eddie Bayers – drums 
 Tom Roady – percussion 
 J.D. Martin – backing vocals 
 Donna McElroy – backing vocals 
 Lewis Nunley – backing vocals 
 Wayland Patton – backing vocals 
 Sharon Rice – backing vocals 
 Debbie Schaal – backing vocals 
 Lisa Silver – backing vocals 
 Jerry Crutchfield – producer 
 Joe Scaife – recording engineer 
 Paul Goldberg – assistant engineer, overdub engineer 
 Ken Friesen – overdub engineer
 John Guess – overdub engineer, remix engineer 
 Dan Rudin – overdub engineer
 Graham Lewis – assistant overdub engineer
 Dany Tremblay – assistant overdub engineer
 Marty Williams – assistant overdub engineer, assistant remix engineer 
 Milan Bogdan – digital editing 
 Glenn Meadows – mastering at Masterfonics (Nashville, Tennessee)
 Dennis Grant – photography 
 Virginia Team – art direction 
 Jerry Joyner – design 
 George Abbott – make-up
 Sheila Yakimov – hair stylist 
 Lee Kinoshita-Bevington – wardrobe 
 Leonard T. Rambeau – management

Chart performance

References

1991 albums
Anne Murray albums
Capitol Records albums
Albums produced by Jerry Crutchfield